Goo Goo Goliath is a 1954 Warner Bros. Merrie Melodies directed by Friz Freleng. The short was released on September 18, 1954.

Plot

Presented in the mockumentary style of previous Robert C. Bruce-narrated shorts, the story focus on a giant baby that had been delivered by the drunken stork to a married couple. The giant baby escapes the couple from their house and wanders into the streets. The stork eventually delivers the giant baby to its correct parents but then delivers the married couple's actual baby (which he had delivered to the giants) to a kangaroo inside the zoo.

Notes
This was the final cartoon to use the original "bullet" sequence for the ending titles. The next cartoon By Word of Mouse, would use smaller backgrounds for the ending titles as well. This was also the final cartoon in the 1953-54 season.

References

1954 animated films
1954 short films
1954 films
1950s Warner Bros. animated short films
Short films directed by Friz Freleng
Merrie Melodies short films
Films scored by Carl Stalling
1950s English-language films
Mockumentary films
Films about babies